Franklin is a surname. Notable people with the surname include:

Franklin (baseball), baseball player in 1884
A. B. Franklin (born 1948), member of the Louisiana House of Representatives
Alex Franklin (born 1988), Puerto Rican basketball player
Aretha Franklin (1942–2018), American singer, songwriter, and pianist
Benjamin Franklin (1706–1790), a Founding Father of the United States
Benjamin Franklin (disambiguation), multiple people
Bonnie Franklin (1944–2013), American actress
Bruce Franklin (guitarist), American musician
Cheryl J. Franklin, American writer
C. L. Franklin (1915–1984), Detroit, Michigan-based Baptist minister and civil rights activist
Charles Samuel Franklin (1879–1964), British radio pioneer
Diane Franklin (born 1962), American actress and model
Dwight Franklin (1888–1971), American artist, taxidermist and set designer
Edward C. Franklin (1928–1982), American pioneering immunologist and physician
Frederic Franklin (1914–2013), British-American ballet dancer and director
Frederick Franklin (1840–1873), United States Navy sailor
Gertrude Franklin (1858–1913), American singer and music educator
Gilbert Franklin (1919–2004), American sculptor, educator
Guitar Pete Franklin (1928–1975), American blues singer, musician and songwriter
H. Bruce Franklin (born 1934), American cultural historian
Hugh Franklin (actor) (1916–1986), American actor
Hugh Franklin (suffragist) (1889–1962), British political activist
James Franklin (naturalist) (c. 1783–1834), British soldier and brother of Sir John Franklin.
James Franklin (American football coach) (born 1972), head coach of Penn State Nittany Lions football team
Jane Franklin (1791–1875), wife of John Franklin, British Royal Navy officer, Governor of Van Diemen's Land and Arctic explorer
Janet Franklin (1959-present), American geographer and landscape ecologist
Jessie Franklin Turner (1881–1956), American fashion designer.
John Franklin (1786–1847), British Royal Navy officer, Governor of Van Diemens Land and Arctic explorer
Joseph Paul Franklin (1950–2013), American serial killer
Kenneth Franklin (1923–2007), American astronomer
Kirk Franklin (born 1970), American choir director and singer-songwriter
Lance "Buddy" Franklin (born 1987), Australian Rules Football player, Hawthorn Football Club
Larry Franklin, U.S. Air Force Reserve colonel involved in AIPAC espionage scandal
Lawson D. Franklin (1804–1861), American planter, slave trader and businessman
Lonnie Franklin (1952–2020), prolific American serial killer and rapist
Marc A. Franklin (born 1932), American lawyer
Michael Franklin (disambiguation), multiple people
Morris Franklin (1801–1885), New York politician and President of New York Life Insurance Co.
Nobia A. Franklin (1892–1934), American entrepreneur
Pamela Franklin (born 1950), British actress
Patricia Franklin, British actress
Philip Albright Small Franklin (1871–1939), American shipping executive, in charge of the White Star Line office and terminus in New York at the time of the Titanic disaster
Rich Franklin (born 1974), American mixed martial arts fighter
Rick Franklin (born 1952), American Piedmont blues guitarist, singer and songwriter
Rosalind Franklin (1920–1958), English physical chemist and crystallographer
Sam Franklin (American football) (born 1996), American football player
Sam Franklin (soccer), American soccer player in the 1990s and 2000s
Scott Franklin (born 1980), Canadian rugby player
Selim Franklin (1814–1885), American pioneer, auctioneer, real estate agent, chess master, and Canadian legislator
Stan Franklin (born 1931), American mathematician, computer scientist and cognitive scientist
Walter Franklin (disambiguation), multiple people
William Franklin (disambiguation), multiple people
Zaire Franklin (born 1996), American football player

See also 
 Franklin (class) in medieval England

English-language surnames